The Whitestone Branch was a branch of the Long Island Rail Road, running north and east along the left bank of the Flushing River from the Port Washington Branch near the modern Willets Point/Flushing sections of Queens, New York.  It crossed the river on one of the three bridges that were later torn down for the Van Wyck Expressway, then ran north along Flushing Bay and east along the East River to Whitestone.

History
Originally conceived as a branch of the Flushing and North Side Railroad that was intended to lead into Westchester County, New York (a connection that never materialized) in 1869, it was consolidated into the Long Island Rail Road in 1876 when its owners, the Poppenhusen family, took over the bankrupt LIRR. It later became part of a subsidiary called the Long Island City and Flushing Railroad.

On October 12, 1912 the branch was electrified. In the 1920s the branch began to lose patronage and the LIRR sought to rid itself of the line. There was a proposal for the city-owned Independent Subway System to buy the line and incorporate it into the New York City Subway system. The deal was not successful, most likely due to the numerous grade crossings that would have been extremely costly to remove. The Interstate Commerce Commission allowed the LIRR to abandon the line in 1932.

Most of the branch was removed, except a small section of the line leading to the Corona Yard which remained well into the 1970s when the LIRR closed the Corona Yard and turned it over to the New York City Transit Authority for subway use. Today only a small section of track remains just east of Mets–Willets Point station, branching off from the Port Washington Branch east of the station. The Flushing–Main Street station of the Port Washington Branch was so named to distinguish it from the Whitestone's Flushing–Bridge Street station. Despite the closing of the Bridge Street station, the LIRR continues to use the name "Main Street" for the Port Washington Branch station to this day.

A spur of the line near the Flushing River was abandoned when it went under water in 1983. Private homes have been built over the section of the line in Whitestone Landing.

Flushing Bay Freight Spur
The Flushing Bay Freight Spur was a freight-only spur that lead to a freight dock on Flushing Bay just west of the Flushing River delta. It began at the Whitestone Branch just north of the junction with the Port Washington Branch, then crossed a junction with a spur of the Woodside Branch leading to Great Neck Junction and the Central Branch, and a second junction with Woodside Branch that lead to the Whitestone Branch, and crossing a short bridge before finally terminating at the freight dock. No trace of the spur is known .

Stations
The entire line was abandoned on February 15, 1932.

References

External links
Whitestone Branch (Unofficial LIRR History Website)
Like a Rolling Whitestone (ForgottenNY.com)
Whitestone Branch Part One, Part Two, Part Three, Part Four, and Part Five (Arrt's Arrchives)
 Tracing Out The LIRR Whitestone Branch (LI & NY Places that are no more)

Long Island Rail Road branches
Transportation in Queens, New York
Railway lines opened in 1869
Railway lines closed in 1932
1869 establishments in New York (state)